Mizdahkan is an archeological complex and the place of the ancient Iranian Khwarazmians, not far from the town of Xoʻjayli in Karakalpakstan, Uzbekistan. This archaeological complex of structures is located 40 minutes from the city of Nukus.

History

Mizdahkan complex occupies a square of 200 hectares. Its two fortresses were built in the 9th-12th centuries. The ossuary burial ground occupies the entire western half of the hill. The last burial in the necropolis dates back to the 14th century. 

The Mongols under Genghis Khan massacred the Iranian inhabitants of the area and after a certain time, the complex was demolished in 1338 during the Tamerlane expedition to Konye-Urgench.

In the legends, Keyumars - the first man on Earth according to the Zoroastrian mythology is related to this site. In Mizdahkan, there is also an underground mausoleum of Princess Mazlum khan Sulu and the mausoleum of the Prophet Shamun (Simon). The mausoleum of Simon turned out to be a false one, which was established in 1966 by a special commission.

Sources
 Mizdakhan Necropolis. Khorezm Tourist Attractions. (2022). Centralasia-travel.com. Retrieved 23 April 2022, from https://www.centralasia-travel.com/en/countries/uzbekistan/places/khorezm/mizdahkan

References

External links
 THE MIZDAHKAN NECROPOLIS: A CITY FOR THE DEAD

Khwarazm
Archaeological sites in Uzbekistan